Hydnum oregonense is a species of tooth fungus in the family Hydnaceae. It was scientifically described in 2018 by Norvell, Liimat. & Niskanen.  It is found in western North America, where it grows under conifer and tan oak trees. It is edible.

References

External links 

Edible fungi
Fungi described in 2018
Fungi of North America
oregonense